Kibdelosporangium banguiense is a Gram-positive, aerobic and non-motile bacterium from the genus Kibdelosporangium which has been isolated from soil from the forest of Pama in the Central African Republic.

References

Pseudonocardiales
Bacteria described in 2016